Us and Them is an Australian situation comedy series which first screened on the Nine Network in 1995. It follows the story of Russell, Nick, Bernadette, and Donna as they work through their differences. The series was produced by Philip Dalkin and Kris Noble, directed by Pino Amenta, David Cameron, Philip Dalkin and written by Elizabeth Coleman, Philip Dalkin and Anthony Morris.

Cast
 Rhys Muldoon as Nick
 Doris Younane as Bernadette "Bernie"
 Brian Meegan as Russell
 Kylle Hogart as Donna

References

External links 

 
 Us and Them at Screen Australia

Australian television sitcoms
Nine Network original programming
1995 Australian television series debuts
1996 Australian television series endings